Alexander Pearce (1790 – 19 July 1824) was an Irish convict who was transported to the penal colony in Van Diemen's Land (now Tasmania), Australia for seven years for theft. He escaped from prison several times, allegedly becoming a cannibal during one of the escapes. In another escape, with one companion, he allegedly killed him and ate him in pieces. He was eventually captured and was hanged in Hobart for murder, before being dissected.

Early life
Pearce was born in County Monaghan, Ireland. A Roman Catholic farm labourer, he was sentenced at Armagh in 1819 to penal transportation to Van Diemen's Land for "the theft of six pairs of shoes". He continued to commit various petty offences whilst in the penal colony in Van Diemen's Land, from which he soon escaped. The 18 May 1822 edition of the Hobart Town Gazette reported this escape and advertised a £10 reward for his recapture. When caught, he was charged with absconding and forging an order, a serious crime. For this he received a second sentence of transportation, this time to the new secondary penal establishment at Sarah Island in Macquarie Harbour.

Escape and cannibalism

On 20 September 1822, Pearce along with seven other convicts of Macquarie Harbour Penal Station: Alexander Dalton, Thomas Bodenham, William Kennerly, Matthew Travers, Edward Brown, Robert Greenhill and John Mather escaped while working on the eastern side of the harbour. Greenhill, who had an axe, appointed himself leader, supported by his friend Travers, with whom he had been sent to Macquarie Harbour for stealing businessman Anthony Fenn Kemp's schooner in an attempt to escape. About 15 days into the journey, the men were starving and drew lots to see who would be killed for food. Thomas Bodenham (or perhaps Alexander Dalton: see below) drew the short straw and Greenhill dispatched him with an axe. At this point three of the company – Dalton, Kennerly, and Brown – took fright and decamped. Kennerly and Brown reached Macquarie Harbour, but Dalton seemed to have died of exhaustion. That left Greenhill, Travers, John Mather, and Alexander Pearce. With Greenhill and Travers acting as a team, it would be Mather's or Pearce's turn next. Pearce seems to have sided with Greenhill and Travers at this point, and Mather was the next victim. It was then that Pearce had some luck: Travers was bitten on the foot by a snake. Greenhill insisted they carry him for five days, but when it became clear he would not recover, killed him.

After that, it was a cat-and-mouse game. Greenhill had the axe, but they were both starving, and they had to sleep. In the end it was Pearce who prevailed. He grabbed the axe, killed Greenhill and dined on his body. He later raided an Aboriginal campsite and stole more food. When he saw sheep, he knew he had reached the settled districts. He was lucky again, as the shepherd who came upon him eating a lamb was an old friend. Pearce was inducted into a sheep-stealing ring, and was eventually picked up with William Davis and Ralph Churton, who were both hanged for bushranging and escaping from a military escort.

In total, Pearce had been on the run for 113 days, a little less than half of which was spent in the wilderness. Locked up in Hobart, Pearce made a confession to the Rev. Robert Knopwood, the magistrate and chaplain. However, Knopwood did not believe the cannibalism story and was convinced the others were still living as bushrangers. He sent Pearce back to Macquarie Harbour.

There are inconsistencies in Pearce's story. He made three confessions – the Knopwood confession; a confession to Lt. Cuthbertson, Commandant of Macquarie Harbour when he was in hospital after the second escape (in this version, Dalton is the first victim); and a confession to Father Phillip Connolly, the colony's Catholic priest, the night before his execution – and some of the details differed. What is incontrovertible is that eight men went into the bush at Macquarie Harbour, and only three came out; and of the four men alive when Dalton, Kennerly and Brown decamped, only one survived.

Within a year, Pearce escaped a second time, joined by a young convict named Thomas Cox. Pearce was captured within ten days and taken to the Supreme Court of Van Diemen's Land in Hobart, where he was tried and convicted of murdering and cannibalising Thomas Cox. Observers noted Pearce did not look like a cannibal. He was only  in height, which was under average for that time, but had a strong wiry frame. He did not seem to be someone who was "laden with the weight of human blood, and believed to have banqueted on human flesh" as the Hobart Town Gazette wrote on 25 June 1824. His captors had found parts of Cox's body in Pearce's pockets, even though he still had food left, and his guilt was beyond doubt this time. Pearce confessed he had killed Cox because when they reached King's River, he discovered that Cox could not swim. Pearce was the first felon to be executed by the new Supreme Court and the first confessed cannibal to pass through the Tasmanian court system.

Alexander Pearce was hanged at the Hobart Town Gaol at 9am on 19 July 1824, after receiving the last rites from Father Connolly.

In popular culture

 Alexander Pearce is the subject of the Australian band Weddings Parties Anything's song "A Tale They Won't Believe". The narrative in the song follows the account given in The Fatal Shore by Robert Hughes.
 Australian band The Drones recorded "Words from the Executioner to Alexander Pearce".
 His adventures were fictionalised in Marcus Clarke's 1874 novel For the Term of His Natural Life.
 A biographical film, The Last Confession of Alexander Pearce, was shot on location in 2008 in Tasmania and Sydney and starred Adrian Dunbar, Ciaran McMenamin, Dan Wyllie, Don Hany and Chris Haywood. It was shown on RTÉ in Ireland on 29 December 2008 and ABC1 in Australia on 25 January 2009.
 Also in 2008, Dying Breed, a horror film about Pearce was released. It featured fictional "descendants" of Pearce. Shot in Tasmania and Melbourne (including at the Pieman River on the West Coast of Tasmania), Dying Breed stars writer/actor Leigh Whannell and Nathan Phillips.
 The story of Pearce's cannibalism was made into another feature-length movie called Van Diemen's Land, released to Australian cinemas in September 2009.

See also

Alferd Packer
Convicts on the West Coast of Tasmania
Hells Gates
List of convicts transported to Australia
List of incidents of cannibalism
List of serial killers by country

References

Further reading
 Collins, Paul. Hell's Gates: the terrible journey of Alexander Pearce, Van Dieman's Land Cannibal. South Yarra, 2002. 
 Sprod, Dan. Alexander Pearce of Macquarie Harbour. Hobart: Cat & Fiddle Press, 1977. 
Kidd, Paul B. Australia's Serial Killers

External links

 Alexander Pearce executed for murder, 19 July 1824 Thomas Bock (c. 1793–1855) Pencil Drawing. State Library of New South Wales

1790 births
1824 deaths
19th-century Irish people
Australian cannibals
Bushrangers
Convict escapees in Australia
Convicts transported to Australia
Executed Australian serial killers
Male serial killers
People from County Fermanagh
People executed by Australian colonies by hanging
People executed for murder
People from Tasmania
Western Tasmania
Incidents of cannibalism